Neobarbara is a genus of moths belonging to the family Tortricidae. It contains only one species, Neobarbara olivacea, which is found in China (Qinghai).

See also
List of Tortricidae genera

References

External links
tortricidae.com

Eucosmini
Monotypic moth genera
Moths of Asia
Tortricidae genera